Landscape Arch is the longest of the many natural rock arches located in Arches National Park, Utah, United States and among the longest natural stone arches in the world.

Description
The arch is among many in the Devils Garden area in the north of the park. Landscape Arch was named by Frank Beckwith who explored the area in the winter of 1933–1934 as the leader of an Arches National Monument scientific expedition. The arch can be accessed by a  graded gravel trail.

The Natural Arch and Bridge Society (NABS) considers Landscape Arch the fifth longest natural arch in the world, after four arches in China.

The most recent recorded rockfall events occurred in the 1990s when one large slab fell in 1991 and then two additional large rockfalls occurred in 1995. Since the rockfalls, the trail beneath the arch has been closed.

See also

 List of longest natural arches
 Delicate Arch
 Durdle Door
 Wall Arch
 Xianren Bridge

References

External links

 Natural Arch and Bridge Society article

Natural arches  of Grand County, Utah
Natural arches of Utah
Arches National Park